Macchapurisvarar Temple is a Hindu temple dedicated to the deity Shiva, located at Koyildevarayanpettai in Thanjavur district, Tamil Nadu, India.

Vaippu Sthalam
According to Periya Puranam, this is one of the shrines of the Vaippu Sthalams sung by Tamil Saivite Nayanar Sambandar.

Presiding deity
The presiding deity in the garbhagriha, represented by the lingam, is known as Macchapurisvarar. The Goddess is known as Sugantha Kunthalambigai.

Specialities
In the prakara shrine of Subramania with his consorts Valli and Deivanai. Subramania is found with Shankha and chakra.

Structure 
This temple was built by Aditya Chola I.In the right side of the temple, shrine of the goddess is found. In the front mandapa, in left, shrines of Dharma Vinayaka, Navagraha and Sanisvara shrines are found.

Location
The temple is located at a distance of 3 km from Papanasam, next to Pandaravadai in Papanasam-Thanjavur.

References

Photogallery

Hindu temples in Thanjavur district
Shiva temples in Thanjavur district